The 2011 Milwaukee 225 was the seventh round of the 2011 IndyCar Series season, held on June 19, 2011 at the  Milwaukee Mile, in West Allis, Wisconsin.

Race

Standings after the race 
Drivers' Championship standings

References 

Milwaukee Indy 225
Milwaukee 225
Milwaukee 225
Milwaukee 225